Lloyd Center/Northeast 11th Avenue is a light rail station on the MAX Blue, Green and Red Lines in Portland, Oregon. It is the 10th stop eastbound on the Eastside MAX. The station is located on the 1200 block of Northeast Holladay Street in Lloyd District.

The station serves the Lloyd Center shopping mall to the north; between the station and the mall is Holladay Park. The station also serves Benson Polytechnic High School to the south.

From its opening in 1986 until 2012, the station was located in TriMet fare zone 1, and starting in 2001 it was also within Fareless Square (renamed the Free Rail Zone in 2010). However, effective September 1, 2012, TriMet discontinued the free-ride zone and all use of zones in its fare structure.

Bus line connections
As of September 2012, this station is served by the following bus lines:
8 - Jackson Park/NE 15th
70 - 12th/NE 33rd Ave
C-Tran 157 - Lloyd District Express

11th Avenue spur

To the northwest of the station is a short spur track on Northeast 11th Avenue now used only for temporary storage of MAX trains for use after major Rose Quarter events. The spur was built for use by the Portland Vintage Trolley, and from 1991 to 2009 that was its primary use.  At the end of the spur, at the southern edge of Multnomah Street, is a small platform for use by Vintage Trolley (VT) cars, that service's Northeast 11th Avenue station, and it was equipped with a shelter.  However, in September 2009, the Vintage Trolley service moved to a new route along the Portland Transit Mall, and with that change the faux-vintage cars only went to and from the NE 11th Avenue stop at the beginning and end of each VT operating day (of which there were about 25 in 2010, but reduced to only seven in 2011) and otherwise operated solely within downtown Portland.  The Vintage Trolley service was discontinued entirely in July 2014.

References

External links
MAX station information (with westbound ID number) from TriMet
MAX station information (with eastbound ID number) from TriMet
MAX Light Rail Stations – more general TriMet page

MAX Light Rail stations
MAX Blue Line
MAX Red Line
MAX Green Line
Railway stations in the United States opened in 1986
1986 establishments in Oregon
Lloyd District, Portland, Oregon
Sullivan's Gulch, Portland, Oregon
Railway stations in Portland, Oregon